is a train station in Jōyō, Kyoto Prefecture, Japan, operated by West Japan Railway Company (JR West).

Lines
Yamashiro-Aodani Station is served by the Nara Line.

Layout
The station consists of two side platforms serving one track each. The station building is a local community center. The station has a POS terminal. The IC card ticket "ICOCA" can be used at this station.

Platforms

History
Station numbering was introduced in March 2018 with Yamashiro-Aodani being assigned station number JR-D14.

Passenger statistics
According to the Kyoto Prefecture statistical report, the average number of passengers per day is as follows. It is the nearest station to Aotani Plum Tree, and the use increases slightly during plum blossom season.

Adjacent stations

References

External links

  

Railway stations in Japan opened in 1926
Railway stations in Kyoto Prefecture